"Coming Home" is a song by Australian indie pop band, Sheppard. The song was released on 10 November 2017, an alternative version was released on the band's second studio album, Watching the Sky (2018).

The band performed the song on Today on 27 November 2017. George Sheppard said "We've tried to capture the joy and excitement we all feel when we get to travel home at last - whether home is a place, a person or a state of mind. It's our most euphoric song to date."

The music video was released in January 2018, alongside announcement of the single's gold certification. The song is used in the trailer for the film, Early Man.

At the ARIA Music Awards of 2018, the song was nominated for Song of the Year.

At the APRA Music Awards of 2019, the song was nominated for Most Played Australian Work and Pop Work of the Year.

Track listing
Digital download
"Coming Home" – 3:38

Charts

Weekly charts

Year-end charts

Certifications

Release history

References

2017 songs
2017 singles
Sheppard (band) songs
Songs written by Matt Rad
Song recordings produced by Matt Rad